Pachygone is a genus of flowering plants belonging to the family Menispermaceae.

Its native range is Tropical and Subtropical Asia to Pacific.

Species:

Pachygone dasycarpa 
Pachygone ledermannii 
Pachygone loyaltiensis 
Pachygone odorifera 
Pachygone ovata 
Pachygone poilanei 
Pachygone sinica 
Pachygone tomentella 
Pachygone valida 
Pachygone vitiensis 
Pachygone yunnanensis

References

Menispermaceae
Menispermaceae genera